Dear Zoe is a 2022 American drama film directed by Gren Wells from a screenplay by Marc Lhormer and Melissa Martin. It is an adaptation of the 2005 novel of the same name by Philip Beard. The film stars Sadie Sink, Theo Rossi, Kweku Collins, Jessica Capshaw, Justin Bartha, and Vivien Lyra Blair.

Synopsis
Dear Zoe tells the story of 15-year-old Tess DeNunzio, who is wracked by guilt after losing her half-sister in a hit and run accident on the day of the September 11 attacks.

Cast 

 Sadie Sink as Tess DeNunzio
 Theo Rossi as Nick DeNunzio
 Kweku Collins as Jimmy
 Jessica Capshaw as Elly Gladstone
 Justin Bartha as David Gladstone
 Vivien Lyra Blair as Emily Gladstone
 Mckenzie Noel Rusiewicz as Zoe Gladstone
 Tanyell Waivers as Vicky

Production 
Filming began in October 2019 in Pittsburgh, Pennsylvania and concluded in November 2019. The film spent an extended period of time in pre-production, with the novel originally optioned in 2010. Production occurred in Pittsburgh, with a primarily local crew.

Release 
The film was released in select theatres and on demand starting November 4, 2022. It was released on DVD on December 13, 2022. But the release date for Blu-ray and Ultra HD is unknown.

Reception

References

External links 

2022 films
2022 drama films
American drama films
Films based on American novels
Films based on the September 11 attacks
Films set in 2001
Films set in 2002
Films set in Pittsburgh
Films shot in Pittsburgh
2020s American films